Paul Jatta (born 21 February 1991) is a Gambian retired footballer. He played as a midfielder.

Jatta presented Gambia at 2007 FIFA U-20 World Cup in Canada and was the captain of the U-17 from Gambia.

References

External links
 Brøndby IF profile

1991 births
Living people
Gambian footballers
The Gambia youth international footballers
Brøndby IF players
Association football midfielders
Danish Superliga players
Expatriate men's footballers in Denmark